Agent K (usually called Kay), born Kevin Brown, is a fictional character and one of the two main protagonists of the Men in Black franchise (the other being Agent J). Kay is portrayed by Tommy Lee Jones in the three films, with Josh Brolin portraying his younger self in the third film, and voiced by Ed O'Ross and Gregg Berger in the animated series. The film's trading card series and Men in Black: The Game give K's full name as Kevin Cunningham, a nod to Lowell Cunningham, the creator of the comic.

Fictional character biography

Early life
K (born Kevin Brown) was one of the people who made first contact with the first aliens to arrive on Earth, and became one of the founding members of the Men In Black. He said he was 29 in 1969, placing his year of birth as 1940. On July 16, 1969, K saved the world from invasion by attaching the ArcNet, a planetary shield, to the Apollo 11 rocket so that it would be deployed in space. In the process, K severed the left arm of the Boglodite invader 'Boris the Animal' and arrested him for the murder of U.S. Army Colonel James Darrell Edwards Jr. K also had a romantic relationship with Agent O, which he discontinued afterward. In 1978, the Zarthan Queen Laurana came to Earth and K fell in love with her. Laurana was eventually murdered for the Light of Zartha (a source of power located in her daughter Laura) by the alien Serleena. K faked sending the Light off-planet, and erased his own memory to prevent her discovery. It is also implied that K is Laura's father.

Men in Black
In the first film, K works with Agent J (Col. Edwards' son), to stop a "Bug" (one of an alien race who feed on carnage caused by wars) from stealing a miniature galaxy before the Bug's enemies destroy Earth to prevent the theft. During the final confrontation with the Bug, it swallows the agents' guns, and K decides to let the Bug swallow him so he can get his gun back, while J distracts him from leaving Earth. Just as the Bug is about to eat J, K shoots it from the inside, and Dr. Laurel Weaver (a morgue worker whom the Bug kidnapped) finishes it off. K later requests that Agent J erase K's memories of his time with the MIB so that he can reunite with a woman he had loved before joining the MIB.

Men in Black: The Series
As the Men in Black animated series takes off from the end of the first film, but skips the plot after Dr. Weaver destroys the Bug, Agent K remains as Agent J's partner while Dr. Weaver has joined the MIB as a medical doctor at the MIB Headquarters. It is revealed early on in the series that a man known as Alpha was the founding Chief of MIB, and K's mentor, but later turned criminal.

Men in Black II
In the second film, at a post office in Truro, Massachusetts, Kevin Brown is recruited by Agent J, to recover the 'Light of Zartha'. After rescuing Laura, they fend off Serleena so they can send Laura safely off the Earth and back to her home planet.

Men in Black 3
In the third film, Boris the Animal time-travels to 1969 and murders a young K (Josh Brolin), allowing the Boglodites to successfully invade Earth, and in response J travels back to 1969 both to save his mentor and best friend's life and to prevent the oncoming Boglodite invasion. When J arrives from the future to kill Boris at Coney Island, K arrests J and takes him to MIB headquarters, where J reveals his mission. Thereafter the precognitive alien 'Griffin the Arcanian' guides J and K to Cape Canaveral, Florida, where Col. Edwards helps them launch the ArcNet, but dies in the process; whereupon K kills Boris. It is then revealed that Col. Edwards is J's father. K also erases a young J’s memory to prevent him from being traumatized. This was seen by an older J who realized that K has been watching over him all his life.

Men in Black: International
In the spin-off film, Agent K does not appear but he is seen in a painting in High-T's office.

See also 
 Agent J
 Men in Black (franchise)

References

External links

Men in Black (franchise)
Animated human characters
Fictional European-American people
Fictional characters from New York City
Fictional alien hunters
Fictional code names
Fictional members of secret societies
Fictional paranormal investigators
Fictional secret agents and spies in films
Fictional secret agents and spies in television
Fictional United States Postal Service workers
Malibu Comics characters
Science fiction film characters
Sony Pictures characters
Film characters introduced in 1997